Neodymium-doped yttrium orthovanadate (Nd:YVO4) is a crystalline material formed by adding neodymium ions to yttrium orthovanadate. It is commonly used as an active laser medium for diode-pumped solid-state lasers. It comes as a transparent blue-tinted material. It is birefringent, therefore rods made of it are usually rectangular.

As in all neodymium-doped laser crystals, the lasing action of Nd:YVO4 is due to its content of neodymium ions, which may be excited by visible or infrared light, and undergo an electronic transition resulting in emission of coherent infrared light at a lower frequency, usually at 1064 nm (other transitions in Nd are available, and can be selected for by external optics).

Basic properties 
Atomic density: ~1.37×1020 atoms/cm3
Crystal structure:
zircon tetragonal (tetragonal bipyramidal)
 space group D4h
 a=b=7.12, c=6.29
Density: 4.22 g/cm3
Mohs hardness: Glass-like, ~5
Thermal expansion coefficient:
 αa=4.43×10−6/K
 αc=11.37×10−6/K
Thermal conductivity:
parallel to C-axis: 5.23 W·m−1·K−1
perpendicular to C-axis: 5.10 W·m−1·K−1

Optical properties 
Lasing wavelengths: 914 nm, 1064 nm, 1342 nm
Crystal class: positive uniaxial, no=na=nb, ne=nc,
no=1.9573, ne=2.1652, at 1064 nm
no=1.9721, ne=2.1858, at 808 nm
no=2.0210, ne=2.2560, at 532 nm
Fluorescence lifetime (spontaneous emission lifetime) as a function of Nd ions concentration:

Absorption cross-section at 808 nm: 5.5×10−20 cm²
Emission cross-section at 1064 nm: 30×10−19 cm²   (Reference: JOSA 66, 1405-1414 (1976).)
Polarized laser emission: π-polarization; parallel to optic axis (c-axis) (for a-cut crystal)
Gain-bandwidth: 0.96 nm (257 GHz) at 1064 nm (for 1.1 atm% Nd doped)
Absorption coefficients at 808 nm for different doping concentrations:

See also 
Yttrium aluminium garnet (YAG)

References

Laser gain media
Crystals
Neodymium compounds
Yttrium compounds
Vanadates